These are the official results of the Women's 10 km Walk event at the 1993 World Championships in Stuttgart, Germany. There were a total of 53 participating athletes, with the final held on Saturday August 14, 1993.

Medalists

Intermediates

Final ranking

See also
 1990 Women's European Championships 10km Walk (Split)
 1992 Women's Olympic 10km Walk (Barcelona)
 1994 Men's European Championships 10km Walk (Helsinki)

References
 Results
 Die Leichtathletik-Statistik-Seite

W
Racewalking at the World Athletics Championships
1993 in women's athletics